Laagi Tujhse Lagan (English: I am Devoted to Loving You) is an Indian television series that aired  Monday to Thursday on Colors TV from 28 December 2009 to 6 January 2012. It's dubbed in Tamil as Aval Oru Thodarkathai on Polimer TV. It was also dubbed into Telugu as Vasantha Kokila on Star Maa.

Set in rural Maharashtra, it is the love story of Nakusha portrayed by Mahii Vij, a beautiful young woman who is forced to hide her beauty, and Dutta Bhau portrayed by Mishal Raheja (later by Shabbir Ahluwalia) who is a local gangster.

Plot
Laagi Tujse Lagan is a love story set against a rural background about Nakusha, a dark complexioned girl who lives with her mother Babi, father Ganpat and brother Sethji.

Nakusha is a beautiful, fair girl in reality but is forced to conceal her beauty to avoid being taken undue advantage of. As the same thing happened to her elder sister years ago. Malmal More, a corrupt police officer, learns the truth and arranges his engagement with Nakusha. On the day of the engagement, Babi discovers that More plans to sell off Nakusha in Dubai and helps Nakusha escape who runs into a gangster named Dutta Bhau.

Dutta Bhau saves Nakusha's life but is badly injured. Nakusha in turn helps him to the hospital and donates blood to save him. Dutta brings Nakusha and her family to live with his family as their house help. Dutta's three sisters, Kala, Leela and Roops live with him and pretend to love him but want his wealth. Also living in his house is Dutta's childhood friend Bajirao.

Unafraid of Dutta, Nakusha becomes his advisor encouraging him to quit drinking. When Dutta's mother tries to convince him to marry a girl named Supriya, Dutta is hesitant and opens up to Nakusha about his heartbreak. Before becoming a gangster he loved a girl named Seema who rejected him wanting to be with someone more well-to-do. The jilted simpleton Dutta Patil then became gangster Dutta Bhau.

Nakusha encourages Dutta to give Supriya a chance and their wedding is fixed. However, Supriya is in love with another man named Ravi. Kala discovers Supriya's affair and uses it to her advantage. Nakusha convinces Supriya to marry Dutta but on the wedding day, Supriya elopes with Ravi and Kala frames Nakusha as having helped her escape so she could have Dutta to herself. An enraged Dutta holds Nakusha responsible. Nakusha admits her love for him but denies all allegations. Dutta gets heavily drunk and marries Nakusha to punish her.

Dutta and Nakusha start an uneasy marriage with Dutta mistreating her. When Dutta finally discovers Naku's innocence, he asks her to leave him. However, Dutta and Nakusha are lost in a jungle when Anna's men attack them. They meet Jagtap Dada in the jungle who makes Dutta realize Nakusha's importance before he dies saving them. Nakusha is abducted by Anna. Dutta kills Anna and, now in love with her, brings Nakusha home with him. Kala and her sisters try to separate them but destiny brings them together. Dutta gets to know about his father Damodar Patil and Madhoo.

The family decides on arranging a wedding ceremony for Dutta and Nakusha. On the wedding night, Dutta gets to know the real Nakusha who is fair and beautiful. In anger, he becomes aloof, but Nakusha's unconditional love soon wins him over. However, Dutta becomes blind and meets Seema. Nakusha's search leads her to Dutta and they live in a jungle for sometime. Kala gets exposed before Dutta and she locks the family members (Including her sisters) in a room. Sudarshan (Leela's husband) joins Kala. Dutta succeeds in saving the whole family, forgives Sudarshan and kicks out Kala. Leela and Roops, fed up of Kala's plans, pledge allegiance to their brother. Dutta and Nakusha return home. Dutta's mentor, Nana Saheb, comes to live with them.

While doing parikrama in a temple, Dutta is abducted and Nakusha, while following the van, disappears. After many ups and downs, Bajirao is thrown out of the house by Aayisahib, who thinks that he is trying to harm the family. When it is revealed that Bajirao is innocent and Nana Saheb is the culprit, Dutta's family is forced to leave their home. Meanwhile, Nakusha is given shelter by a woman in a fishery village. There she meets Dighu. However, she does not remember anything from her past life. They name her Sahiba.

After many conflicts and troubles, Dighu falls in love with Sahiba. It is finally revealed that Nana kidnapped Dutta and that he was working with Kala. Ignorant of this, Dighu brings Nakusha with him to stay at Nana's place. It is during this time that we see the return of Dutta, who was held hostage by Nana in a drugged state.

Dutta manages to escape from Nana and go to live with Kala, then Digu helps Baji and the family by returning them to their home that was under Nana's hands. Nana discovers the fact and punishes Dighu. He discovers that Nana is guilty of his mother's death, then kills him. Dutta trains and returns as strong as before and decides to go home. Dutta then discovers that Dighu is the one who kidnapped him and punishes him. Nakusha is pregnant and leaves the house going to live in another place, because she didn't want her son to be born in a house where the father is a gangster. Dutta leaves the house for a while and goes to Nakusha, working hard. Dutta's mother is shot by Yoginder at the hands of Sudarshan. Eventually Nakusha is kidnapped by Yoginder who eventually dies along with his sister Sunaina and Dighu.

Cast

Main
Mahhi Vij as Nakusha Dutta Patil 
Mishal Raheja / Shabbir Ahluwalia as Dutta Patil / Dutta Bhau
 Swati Chitnis as Aayi Sahib 
 Chinmayee Surve as Badi, Roopa, Nakusha and Shetji's mother
 Kali Prasad Mukherjee as Ganpat, Roopa, Nakusha and Shetji's father

Recurring
 Jay Thakkar as Shetji, Nakusha's brother
 Vinay Rohrra as Baaji Rao, Dutta's best friend and second-in-command
 Aashka Goradia as Kalavati "Kala", Dutta's sister 
 Jaineeraj Rajpurohit as Kishore, Kalawati's husband 
 Tinnu Anand as Damodar Patil, Dutta's estranged father 
Soni Singh as Madhu, Dutta's Paternal half-sister 
 Neetu Wadhwa as Roopvati "Roop", Dutta's youngest sister 
 Ansha Sayed / Falaq Naaz as Leelavati "Leela", Dutta's younger sister 
 Sumit Kaul as Sudarshan, Leela's husband
 Kannan Arunachalam as Raghunath "Nana Saheb" Tawde, Dutta Bhau's mentor
 Murli Sharma as Maleshwar Anna
 Mouli Ganguly as Subbalakshmi 
Pavan Malhotra as Malmar More, a corrupt police officer 
 Ridhi Dogra as Supriya, Dutta's ex-fiancée 
 Pranitaa Pandit as Seema, Dutta's ex-girlfriend 
Aadesh Chaudhary as Digambar / Munna 
Sunayana Fozdar as Sunayana, Yogendra's younger sister and Deegu's obsessive lover.
Anupam Bhattacharya as Yogendra, Sunayana's brother and Dutta's enemy.

Reception
Ratings

Laagi Tujhse Lagan was one of the most watched Hindi GEC. The show was its peak from the beginning till the end of March 2011.

In week of 26 March 2011, it occupied second position with 5.6 TVR.

After the exit of lead actor Mishal Raheja in last week of March 2011, the show TRP rating started to go down and eventually ended in January 2012.

Adaptations

References

External links 
Official Website

2009 Indian television series debuts
Indian television soap operas
Colors TV original programming
2012 Indian television series endings